Nirbhay Singh Gurjar 
was an Indian criminal and one of the last dacoits of the Chambal and known as the "Last Lion of Chambal". He terrorized the Chambal ravines in India, the lawless zone at the cusp of two states Uttar Pradesh and Madhya Pradesh for 31 years.

Life 

Gujjar was born in Panchdeora village of Jalaun district, Uttar Pradesh and died on 7 November 2005 in Etawah, India.

Dacoity career 
With this fatwa Sarpanch, Member of Legislative Assembly (MLA)  and Member of Parliament (MP) were elected.

Help to ASI

According to the Regional Director (North) of the Archaeological Survey of India (ASI), Mr.K. K. Muhammed, Gurjar and his gang provided much help to Archaeological Survey of India for the restoration of Bateshwar Hindu temples, Madhya Pradesh, that were constructed during the Gurjara-Pratihara empire between 8th to 11th century.

Film
Indian Bollywood film director Krishna Mishra also made a Hindi movie named as Beehad - The Ravine, which starred Vikas Shrivastav. A real-life take on Gujjar's life – journeying with him from 1975.

Indian politics
In August 2005 he had expressed his desire to surrender before the Uttar Pradesh Chief Minister Mulayam Singh Yadav and join Indian politics.

References

Indian robbers
2005 deaths
People shot dead by law enforcement officers in India
Criminals from Uttar Pradesh
1957 births
Indian murderers
Indian kidnappers